Perekop (Ukrainian & Russian: Перекоп;) is an urban-type settlement located on the Perekop Isthmus connecting the Crimean peninsula to the Ukrainian mainland. It is known for the fortress Or Qapi that served as the gateway to Crimea. The village currently is part of Armiansk Municipality. Population:

Name
The original name was of the Greek settlement of Taphros which means a dug-out locality. The people were called Taphrians

Thereafter was the equivalent name of Or Qapı in the Crimean Tatar language meaning Or - trench and Qapı - gate, and subsequently the name Perekop in the Slavic languages which literally means an over-dug locality.

History

Due to its key position, over the history Perekop was under many sieges.

During the Russo-Turkish War (1735–1739), Russian field marshal Burkhard Christoph von Munnich successfully stormed the fortifications on June 17, 1736 and left the Tatar fortress in ruins. This was a serious, if not mortal, blow to the independence of the Crimean Khanate.

The town was virtually wiped out during the Siege of Perekop by the Red Army in 1920. The siege was a key episode of the Russian Civil War. The success of the Bolsheviks allowed them to oust Pyotr Wrangel's White Army from the Crimea. Twelve years later, the Soviets founded the new town of Krasnoperekopsk  to the south. 

During World War II, Perekop was occupied by the German Army from September 27, 1941 to November 1, 1943. The capture of Perekop (by both the Wehrmacht in 1941 and the Red Army in 1943) was used to cut off Crimea from Ukraine.

References

External links
 Registration card at Verkhovna Rada
 Description of Perekop at the geographical dictionary of Polish Kingdom
 Perekop's Coat of Arms
 A website dedicated to Perekop

Armiansk Municipality
Urban-type settlements in Crimea
Perekopsky Uyezd